Pulvinodecton is a genus of lichen-forming fungi in the family Roccellaceae. It has two species. The genus was circumscribed in 1998 by lichenologists Aino Henssen and Göran Thor, with Pulvinodecton kurzii assigned as the type species. Pulvinodecton differs from Erythrodecton in having spindle-shaped (fusiform) rather than doubly club-shaped (biclavate) ascospores, and by the development of its ascocarp. Additionally, the unusual pycnidia of Pulvinodecton species feature a deeply divided cavity with more than one ostiole.

Species
Pulvinodecton kurzii 
Pulvinodecton seychellensis

References

Roccellaceae
Arthoniomycetes genera
Taxa named by Aino Henssen
Taxa described in 1998